Lórév (Serbian: Ловра, Lovra) is a village on Csepel Island in Hungary. It is situated in Pest County.

Name

Lórév means "horse ford" in Hungarian referring to the nearby ford of the Danube.

Demographics

Lórév is the only settlement in Hungary with an ethnic Serb majority. This small village of 307 people had 180 (58.63%) Serb inhabitants in 2001 (and 202 people with a Serb "cultural heritage"). 39.09% of the population are Hungarians (120 people). Also, the neighbouring village of Szigetcsép and the town of Ráckeve on the Csepel Island have Serb settlements. Not far to the north the Bunjevci settlement of Tököl is to be found. A tradition of mutual weddings between these two geographically close villages existed as well as strong connections with Serbs from the villages of Medina in the south, three villages north of Budapest -- Budakalász, Pomáz and Csobánka—and the small town of Szentendre.

Religion

According to the 2001 census the religious distribution of the population included 69 Roman Catholics, 32 Calvinists and 181 Serbian Orthodox.

See also
Csepel Island
Pest County
Serbs in Hungary

References

External links

Populated places in Pest County
Serb communities in Hungary